Jack Brennan (18 August 1897 – 25 December 1987) was an Australian rules footballer who played for the South Melbourne Football Club in the Victorian Football League (VFL)

References

External links 

1897 births
1987 deaths
Australian rules footballers from Victoria (Australia)
Sydney Swans players